M Tamil Selvan is a former Indian weightlifter who won silver medals in the men's Bantamweight event at 1978 Commonwealth Games and in the men's Featherweight event at 1982 Commonwealth Games. He was conferred with the Arjuna Award in the year 1977-78 by the Government of India.

See also
List of people from Vellore
List of Tamil recipients of the Arjuna Award

References

1955 births
Living people
Indian male weightlifters
Recipients of the Arjuna Award
Commonwealth Games silver medallists for India
Commonwealth Games medallists in weightlifting
Weightlifters at the 1978 Commonwealth Games
Weightlifters at the 1982 Commonwealth Games
20th-century Indian people
Medallists at the 1978 Commonwealth Games
Medallists at the 1982 Commonwealth Games